Their Greatest Hits may refer to:

 Their Greatest Hits (Hot Chocolate album), 1993
 Their Greatest Hits: The Record, 2001 album by the Bee Gees
 Their Greatest Hits (1971–1975), 1976 album by Eagles